Harpalus regressus is a species of ground beetle in the subfamily Harpalinae. It was described by Casey in 1914.

References

regressus
Beetles described in 1914